David Narine (born 16 August 1949) is a former West Indian cricket umpire. He stood in three Test matches between 1983 and 1985 and four ODI games between 1981 and 1985.

See also
 List of Test cricket umpires
 List of One Day International cricket umpires

References

1949 births
Living people
West Indian Test cricket umpires
West Indian One Day International cricket umpires